Pat Neely (born July 20, 1964) is an American restaurateur, television personality, and author. He is the co-owner of Neely's Bar-B-Que restaurant in downtown Memphis, Tennessee. He and former wife Gina hosted two Food Network television programs, Down Home with the Neelys and Road Tasted with the Neelys. The pair also co-wrote a cook book. Down Home became the highest rated debut for a Food Network show within the "In the Kitchen" series, which appear on weekend mornings.

Personal life
Neely was born in Detroit, Michigan, according to the Neely's episode of Chefography. He and Gina (née Ervin) dated in high school in the 1980s. While Pat was married to another woman, Pat and Gina reunited at their 10th reunion. Pat married Gina in 1994. They have two daughters: Spenser and Shelbi. Pat and Gina Neely each had been married once before. 

In September 2014, Gina Neely filed for divorce, citing irreconcilable differences.

Restaurant
In 1988, Neely and three of his brothers (Gaelin, Tony, and Mark) opened a barbecue restaurant in downtown Memphis, aided by their uncle, Jim Neely, a well-known Memphis restaurateur and owner of Jim Neely's Interstate Bar-B-Que. Jim' Neely's sister, Beverly Neely, is owner of Jay-Bee's Bar-B-Que in Gardena, California, and her son, Curtis Williams, is the general manager. The brothers went on to establish their own reputations separate from their uncle's.

The enterprise grew to four Neely’s Bar-B-Que locations: two in Memphis and two in Nashville. On July 9, 2008, the location in Memphis' Mt. Moriah neighborhood caught fire.

Pat and Gina Neely, and partner Abraham Merchant, opened a New York City restaurant, initially called Neely’s Pig Parlor. The restaurant eventually opened in 2011 as Neely's Barbecue Parlor.
  
In August 2008, they acquired a  space in mid-town Memphis slated to be a corporate headquarters.

In 2008, their cousin (Jim Neely's son) opened Ken Neely's Hickory Bar-B-Que in Memphis.

The two Memphis locations of Neely's Bar-B-Que closed in 2013.

Television shows
Neely and wife Gina host two shows on Food Network, Down Home with the Neelys and Road Tasted with the Neelys. Down Home began airing in February 2008. Food Network personality Paula Deen helped the pair get their first show. During the summer of 2006 her sons, Bobby and Jamie Deen, featured the Neely's Bar-B-Que Nashville location on their show Road Tasted. In September 2006, Paula ate at the Neely's downtown Memphis restaurant and was impressed. In January 2007, the Neelys were invited to appear on Paula's Party.

The Neelys taped the sixth season of Down Home, which airs seven days a week on the Food Network. Following the success of Down Home, the Neelys took over the Road Tasted show from the Deen brothers in July 2008, which was then changed to Road Tasted with the Neelys.
Neely hosted Save to Win on Saturdays on The CW from November 5, 2016 to May 20, 2017.

Book
Pat and Gina have written their first cookbook "Down Home with the Neelys: A Southern Family Cookbook.” It is also co-written by Paula Disbrowe, with the foreword written by Paula Deen. It was released in May 2009 and published by Knopf.

References

American television chefs
American male chefs
Food Network chefs
People from Memphis, Tennessee
Writers from Detroit
Living people
1964 births